Jackson D. Sayama is an American politician who is currently the Hawaii state representative in Hawaii's 20th district.

Education 
A fourth-generation Japanese-American, Sayama attended the Punahou School, graduating in 2015. Sayama attended New York University Shanghai, graduating in 2019 with a degree in Chinese Global Studies. He is currently attending the University of Hawaiʻi, where he intends to get a Master of Public Administration degree.

Political career 
He won the seat after longtime incumbent Democrat Calvin Say retired to run for Honolulu City Council. He won election in 2020 against Republican candidate Julia Allen, 74.6% to 25.4%. Sayama is a member of the Progressive Legislative Caucus. Sayama supports a carbon tax to help Hawaii transition to using 100% renewable energy by 2045.

References

American politicians of Japanese descent
Living people
Hawaii politicians of Japanese descent
Democratic Party members of the Hawaii House of Representatives
21st-century American politicians
Year of birth missing (living people)